Winter of Our Dreams is a 1981 Australian drama film directed by John Duigan. Judy Davis won the Best Actress in a Lead Role in the AFI Awards for her performance in the film. The film was nominated in 6 other categories also. It was also entered into the 13th Moscow International Film Festival where Judy Davis won the award for Best Actress.

Plot
Rob (Bryan Brown), a bookshop owner, hears of the suicide of an old girlfriend Lisa (Margie McCrae). While investigating the case he meets Lou (Judy Davis), a prostitute and old friend of Lisa's.

Cast
Judy Davis as Lou
Bryan Brown as Rob
Cathy Downes as Gretel
Mercia Deane-Johns as Angela
Baz Luhrmann as Pete
Peter Mochrie as Tim
Mervyn Drake as Mick
Margie McCrae as Lisa Blaine
Joy Hruby as Marge
Kim Deacon as Michelle

Production
In the late 1970s Duigan wrote a script called Someone Left the Cake Out in the Rain about a European anti-nuclear campaigner who comes to Australia and meets a 60s radical turned yuppie. The film was never made but the former radical character was re used in Winter of Our Dreams.

There were three weeks of rehearsals and five weeks of shooting in Kings Cross and Balmain.

Box office
Winter of Our Dreams was popular, grossing $959,000 at the box office in Australia, which is equivalent to $3,107,160 in 2009 dollars.

See also
Cinema of Australia

References

Further reading

External links

Winter of Our Dreams at the Australian screen
Winter of Our Dreams at Oz Movies

1981 films
1981 drama films
Australian drama films
1980s English-language films
Films directed by John Duigan
1980s Australian films